Swandale is an unincorporated community and coal town in Clay County, West Virginia, United States.

The community most likely was named after the local Swan family.

References

Unincorporated communities in West Virginia
Unincorporated communities in Clay County, West Virginia
Coal towns in West Virginia
Charleston, West Virginia metropolitan area